United Nations Security Council resolution 1249, adopted on 25 June 1999, after examining the application of the Republic of Nauru for membership in the United Nations, the Council recommended to the General Assembly that Nauru be admitted, bringing total membership of the United Nations to 187.

Resolution 1249 was adopted by 14 votes to none against and one abstention from China which said it could not support the recommendation (due to Nauru's close diplomatic ties to Taiwan) but would not veto it in the interests of the people of both countries.

See also
 Enlargement of the United Nations
 Member states of the United Nations
 List of United Nations Security Council Resolutions 1201 to 1300 (1998–2000)

References

External links
 
Text of the Resolution at undocs.org

 1249
 1249
 1249
1999 in Nauru
June 1999 events